John Kane was an American soldier who fought in the American Civil War. Kane received his country's highest award for bravery during combat, the Medal of Honor. Kane's medal was won for gallantry during the assault on Fort Gregg on April 2, 1865. He was honored with the award on May 12, 1865.

Kane was born in Ireland, and in August 1862 (at age 28) joined the US Army from Buffalo, New York. He mustered out with his regiment in June 1865.

Medal of Honor citation

See also
List of American Civil War Medal of Honor recipients: G–L

References

Year of birth unknown
Year of death unknown
American Civil War recipients of the Medal of Honor
Irish-born Medal of Honor recipients
Irish emigrants to the United States (before 1923)
People of New York (state) in the American Civil War
Union Army officers
United States Army Medal of Honor recipients